Riad Garcia Pires Ribeiro (born ) is a Brazilian male volleyball player. He is part of the Brazil men's national volleyball team. With his club Trentino BetClic he won the 2010 FIVB Volleyball Men's Club World Championship. On club level he plays now for SESI.

References

External links
 profile at FIVB.org

1981 births
Living people
Brazilian men's volleyball players
Place of birth missing (living people)
Volleyball players from Rio de Janeiro (city)